Naval Landing Force Equipment Depot may refer to:

 Naval Landing Force Equipment Depot (Albany, California) - after World War II, this facility became Golden Gate Fields 
 Naval Landing Force Equipment Depot (Norfolk, Virginia) (1942 - 1946) - facilities purchased by Ford Motor Company and became the Norfolk Assembly after World War II